The Little Rock Trojans men's basketball team (formerly branded as the Arkansas–Little Rock Trojans) represents the University of Arkansas at Little Rock in Little Rock, Arkansas, United States. The Trojans joined the Ohio Valley Conference (OVC) in 2022 after 31 seasons in the Sun Belt Conference. They are led by fifth-year head coach Darrell Walker. They play their home games at the Jack Stephens Center.

Rebranding
On July 1, 2015, the Trojans officially announced they would no longer be branded as "Arkansas-Little Rock" or "UALR," but will be the Little Rock Trojans effective immediately.

Staff
The following are the staff members of the Little Rock Trojans men's basketball team:

Conference affiliations
 1930–31 to 1978–79 – Independent (no team during the 1939–40 to 1940–41, 1944–45, and 1956–57 to 1960–61 seasons)
 1961–62 to 1976–77 – Arkansas Intercollegiate Conference
 1977–78 to 1978–79 – NCAA Division I Independent
 1979–80 to 1990–91 – Trans-America Athletic Conference (now known as the ASUN Conference)
 1991–92 to 2021–22 – Sun Belt Conference
 2022–23 to present – Ohio Valley Conference

Postseason results

NCAA tournament results
The Trojans have appeared in the NCAA tournament five times. Their combined record is 2–5.

NIT results
The Trojans have appeared in the National Invitation Tournament (NIT) three times. Their combined record is 3–4.

References

External links